Casterolimulus is an extinct genus of xiphosuran. It is known from the Late Cretaceous Fox Hills Formation of North America, and it lived in freshwater environments. It is a member of the family Limulidae, and is placed as a close relative of Victalimulus from the Early Cretaceous of Australia.

References

Xiphosura